Mukim Padang Perahu is a mukim, or sub-district, in Kubang Pasu District, Kedah, Malaysia.

Kubang Pasu District
Mukims of Kedah